David L. G. Webb, formerly known as Chemo and formally called Dangerous Dave, and now is known as Forest DLG is an English music producer and DJ. He has also released several albums under the pseudonym ‘Telemachus’. As a sound engineer he has worked at the forefront of the British Hip Hop scene, acting as chief engineer for YNR Productions and High Focus Records. Chemo was recognised by the Guardian newspaper as a man who “has helped British music move along more than most people will ever know”.

Career

2004 – 2011
Named after a fictional DC Comics supervillain, Chemo first started as a producer and DJ for London Hip Hop group 'Frontline'. He helped found legendary Hip Hop night ‘Speakers Corner’ in Brixton. Off the back of Speakers Corner, Chemo worked on albums for Verb T, Kyza, Kashmere, Manage, Jehst, Triple Darkness and others.

In 2007, Chemo produced a compilation album titled Squirrelz With Gunz, alongside World DMC champion DJ Skully. A second compilation of his work between 2007-2011 entitled The Stomach of the Mountain was released in 2011.

2011 – present
Telemachus (born in 2011) is a pseudonym used for Webb’s solo projects and to allow him to be “a little more artful.”. The debut release was a 7" Vinyl entitled ‘Scarecrows’ featuring Roc Marciano. This was taken from the ‘In The Evening’ album which was awarded album of the month by Q Magazine and named one of the albums of the year by The Quietus. Telemachus followed up this album by travelling to North Africa in 2014 to create his ‘In Morocco’ album.

Chemo continued to produce for numerous vocalists and was lauded in particular for executive producing albums for Jam Baxter and Onoe Caponoe on High Focus Records.

In April 2020, Telemachus signed to High Focus Records and soon after released his latest album Boring & Weird Historical Music on High Focus Records.

At the start of 2021, he announced via Twitter that he was retiring the pseudonym Chemo and would be known as Forest DLG going forward.

Style
Early productions often mirrored pioneers such as Pete Rock, Havoc, Alchemist, J Dilla, El-P and Rza - eventually evolving into a more nuanced and varied style - “From beautifully shuffling jazz drums to sinister synths to delicately plucked strings, he displays a vast knowledge of music and an ear for off the wall styles.”

The birth of Telemachus gave him the opportunity to call upon far wider influences (psychedelic rock, dancehall, blues, West African Highlife) that led journalist Neil Kulkarni to describe Chemo as “an ancient, modern and unique voice in British Music”.

Discography

Studio albums
 2007 - Chemo - Squirrelz With Gunz
 2010 - Chemo - The Stomach of the Mountain
 2011 - Telemachus - Scarecrows ft. Roc Marciano
 2013 - Telemachus - In the Evening
 2014 - Telemachus - In Morocco
 2020 - Telemachus - Boring & Weird Historical Music

Collaborative
 2008 - Triple Darkness - Anathema
 2014 - Jam Baxter - ...so we ate them whole
 2015 - Onoe Caponoe - Tales from Planet Cattele
 2017 - Jam Baxter - Mansion 38
 2018 - Jam Baxter - Touching Scenes
 2021 - Dead Silk - Dead Silk I and II
 2022 - Jam Baxter - Fetch The Poison

References

External links
 KMJ45 Studios
 Telemachus Soundcloud

English hip hop musicians
English record producers
Living people
1984 births
Musicians from London